Edward Waymouth Reid FRS (11 October 1862, Canterbury – 10 March 1948, Edinburgh) was a British physiologist.

Born the fourth son of James, Reid,  F.R.C.S.E., E. Waymouth Reid was educated at Sutton Valence Grammar School and then matriculated in 1879 at Cavendish College, University of Cambridge, where he graduated B.A. in 1883. At St Bartholomew's Hospital in 1885 he qualified M.B. and M.R.C.S. and was an assistant electrician there. At St Mary's Hospital he was a demonstrator in physiology from 1885 to 1887 and a lecturer in physiology from 1887 to 1889.

While at Dundee he performed early experiments with x-rays with the Dutch physicist Johannes Kuenen.

Waymouth Reid was elected F.R.S. in 1898 and graduated Sc.D. in 1904 from Downing College, Cambridge. He was Dean of the Medical Faculty of the University of St Andrews.

Reid's work in the early 1900s on active transport across biological membranes was not fully appreciated until the 1950s.

Under the alias Herr Doktor Bimstein Pumpduluder, Reid used his laboratory at University College to make sweets to be sold in the Dundee Student's Union to raise money for the College's playing field fund.

Selected publications
with Augustus D. Waller: 

with Fred J. Hambly: 

with J. S. Macdonald:

References

1862 births
1948 deaths
Alumni of Cavendish College, Cambridge
Academics of the University of Dundee
Academics of the University of St Andrews
British physiologists
Fellows of the Royal Society